Reykhólahreppur is a municipality in the Westfjords, Iceland. Its major settlement is Reykhólar.

References

Municipalities of Iceland
Westfjords